Österskär is eastern part of Åkersberga, Österåker Municipality in Sweden. It hosts the terminal station of the Stockholm suburban railway Roslagsbanan.
The area is located in a hilly peninsula between Tunaviken and Sätterfjärden northwest of Trälhavet. Due to the height differences and the possibility to get a sea view speed up the building process. Many Stockholmers have their boats in one of Österskär's many marinas.



History 
In 1906, Roslagsbanan opened to Österskär for freight traffic. Among other things in Österskär, there was a smaller feldspar and quartz mine as well as a mansion (Tuna Gård). During the 1900s, plans to make Österskär an exclusive suburb was settled, and several large villas were built along the coastline. Influences came from Djursholm and Saltsjöbaden. At the time a beach, Österskärs Havsbad (more popularly known as Solbrännan) was built and Österskärs steam boat jetty was completed in 1912.  During the 1920s and 30s, more and more holiday homes were built and became a summer residence for many Stockholmers. The big expansion of full-time residents took off in the 1970s and now more or less the entire peninsula is built on. Österskär has relatively high real estate prices compared to rest of Sweden and is one of northern Stockholm's most exclusive suburbs.

People 

 Jesper Parnevik
 Bosse Parnevik
 Peg Parnevik
 Penny Parnevik
 Olle Helander
 Pär Nuder
 Stig Järrel
 Marianne Fredriksson
 Carina Berg
 Sara Sangfelt

See also 
 Österåker
 Åkersberga
 Trälhavets Båtklubb

Metropolitan Stockholm